Guarijio, Huarijio, Warihío or Varihío may refer to:

 Guarijio people, an ethnic group of Mexico
 Huarijio language, a Uto-Aztecan language of Mexico